Atak or ATAK may refer to:

People
Atak (actor), Filipino actor in Girl, Boy, Bakla, Tomboy
Burhan Atak, Turkish footballer
Hurşit Atak, Turkish weightlifter
Serkan Atak, Turkish footballer
Atak Lual, South Sudanese footballer
Atak Ngor, South Sudanese director

Military
Android Team Awareness Kit, a navigation and situational awareness app (or its similarly named and developed military counterpart: Android Tactical Assault Kit)
TAI/AgustaWestland T129 ATAK, a Turkish multi-role attack helicopter developed from the Agusta A129 Mangusta
TAI T929 ATAK 2, a Turkish attack helicopter developed from the T129 ATAK and T625 Gökbey helicopters

Other
Atak (village), a village in the Barisal District of southern-central Bangladesh
Atak (clan), the name for a clan of the Royma, a nomadic pastoral Muslim community in India and Pakistan
ATAK Sportswear, a Slovakian sports equipment manufacturer
Atak (music hall), a music venue in Enschede, Netherlands